The 38th Annual Grammy Awards were held on February 28, 1996, at Shrine Auditorium, Los Angeles. The awards recognized accomplishments by musicians from the previous year. Alanis Morissette was the main recipient, being awarded four trophies, including Album of the Year. Mariah Carey and Boyz II Men opened the show with their Record of the Year nominated "One Sweet Day".

The ceremony was controversial for its unexpected snub of Mariah Carey's Daydream album, which proved to be one of the bestselling and most acclaimed albums of 1995. When the Grammy Award nominees were announced, and Daydream was nominated for six different awards, critics began raving how it would be "cleaning up" that year. Carey, being a multiple award nominee, was one of the headlining performers. Together with Boyz II Men, she sang a live rendition of "One Sweet Day", to a very positive response. The album had lost all of its six nominations, shocking most critics who branded it the "album of the year". Carey did not perform again until the 2006 ceremony, when she was nominated for eight awards (winning three) for The Emancipation of Mimi. 

The ceremony is also significant for Tupac Shakur introducing Peter Criss, Ace Frehley, Gene Simmons, and Paul Stanley of Kiss for the first time in full makeup and costume since 1979. Shakur said "And I've seen just about everything now," in response to seeing Kiss walk on stage to announce the nominees  for Best Pop Performance by a Duo or Group With Vocal.

Performers

Presenters

Award winners

General
Record of the Year
 "Kiss From a Rose" – Seal
 Trevor Horn, producer
 "One Sweet Day" – Mariah Carey & Boyz II Men 
 Walter Afanasieff & Mariah Carey, producers
 "Gangsta's Paradise" – Coolio
 Doug Rasheed, producer
 "One of Us" – Joan Osborne 
 Rick Chertoff, producer
 "Waterfalls" – TLC
 Organized Noize, producer

Album of the Year
 Jagged Little Pill – Alanis Morissette
 Glen Ballard, producer
 Daydream – Mariah Carey
 Walter Afanasieff, Mariah Carey, Jermaine Dupri, Dave Hall, David Morales & Manuel Seal, producers
 HIStory: Past, Present and Future, Book I – Michael Jackson
 Dallas Austin, Bill Bottrell, David Foster, Janet Jackson, Michael Jackson, Jimmy Jam, R. Kelly, Terry Lewis, René & Bruce Swedien, producers
 Relish – Joan Osborne
 Rick Chertoff, producer
 Vitalogy – Pearl Jam
 Brendan O'Brien & Pearl Jam, producers

Song of the Year
 "Kiss From a Rose"
 Seal, songwriter (Seal)
 "I Can Love You Like That"
 Maribeth Derry, Steve Diamond & Jennifer Kimball, songwriters (All-4-One)
 "One of Us"
 Eric Bazilian, songwriter (Joan Osborne)
 "You Are Not Alone"
 R. Kelly, songwriter (Michael Jackson)
 "You Oughta Know"
 Glen Ballard & Alanis Morissette, songwriters (Alanis Morissette)

Best New Artist
 Hootie & the Blowfish
 Brandy
 Alanis Morissette
 Joan Osborne
 Shania Twain

Alternative
Best Alternative Music Performance
Nirvana for MTV Unplugged in New York

Blues
Best Traditional Blues Album
John Lee Hooker for Chill Out

Best Contemporary Blues Album
Buddy Guy for Slippin' In

Children's
Best Musical Album for Children
J. Aaron Brown, David R. Lehman (producers) & Barbara Bailey Hutchison for Sleepy Time Lullabys
Best Spoken Word Album for Children
Dan Broatman, Martin Sauer (producers) & Patrick Stewart for Prokofiev: Peter and the Wolf

Classical
Best Orchestral Performance
Pierre Boulez (conductor) & the Cleveland Orchestra for Debussy: La Mer
Best Classical Vocal Performance
Christopher Hogwood (conductor), Sylvia McNair & the Academy of Ancient Music for The Echoing Air – The Music of Henry Purcell
Best Opera Recording
Raymond Minshull (producer), Charles Dutoit (conductor), Gary Lakes, Françoise Pollet, Gino Quilico, Deborah Voigt & L'Orchestre Symphonique de Montréal & Chorus for Berlioz: Les Troyens
Best Choral Performance
Herbert Blomstedt (conductor), Vance George (choir director) & the San Francisco Symphony Orchestra & Chorus for Brahms: Ein Deutsches Requiem
Best Instrumental Soloist(s) Performance (with orchestra)
Seiji Ozawa (conductor), Itzhak Perlman & the Boston Symphony Orchestra for The American Album – Works of Bernstein, Barber, Foss
Best Instrumental Soloist Performance (without orchestra)
Radu Lupu for Schubert: Piano Sonatas (B-flat major and A major)
Best Chamber Music Performance
Emanuel Ax, Yo-Yo Ma & Richard Stoltzman for Brahms/Beethoven/Mozart: Clarinet Trios
Best Classical Contemporary Composition
Olivier Messiaen (composer) & Myung-whun Chung (conductor) for Messiaen: Concert a Quatre
Best Classical Album
Karl-August Naegler (producer), Pierre Boulez (conductor) & the Cleveland Orchestra & Chorus for Debussy: La Mer; Nocturnes; Jeux

Comedy
From 1994 through 2003, see "Best Spoken Comedy Album" under the "Spoken" field, below.

Composing and arranging
Best Instrumental Composition
Bill Holman (composer) for "A View From the Side" performed by The Bill Holman Band
Best Song Written Specifically for a Motion Picture or for Television
Alan Menken & Stephen Schwartz (songwriters) for "Colors of the Wind" performed by Vanessa Williams 
Best Instrumental Composition Written for a Motion Picture or for Television
Hans Zimmer (composer) for Crimson Tide
Best Instrumental Arrangement
Robert Farnon (arranger) for "Lament" performed by J. J. Johnson & the Robert Farnon Orchestra
Best Instrumental Arrangement with Accompanying Vocal(s)
Rob McConnell (arranger) for "I Get a Kick Out of You" performed by Mel Tormé with Rob McConnell & The Boss Brass

Country
Best Female Country Vocal Performance
Alison Krauss for "Baby, Now That I've Found You"
Best Male Country Vocal Performance
Vince Gill for "Go Rest High on That Mountain"
Best Country Performance by a Duo or Group with Vocal
The Mavericks for "Here Comes the Rain"
Best Country Collaboration with Vocals
Alison Krauss & Shenandoah for "Somewhere in the Vicinity of the Heart"
Best Country Instrumental Performance
Asleep at the Wheel, Béla Fleck & Johnny Gimble for "Hightower"
Best Country Song
Vince Gill (songwriter) for "Go Rest High on That Mountain"
Best Country Album
Robert John "Mutt" Lange (producer) & Shania Twain for The Woman in Me
Best Bluegrass Album
The Nashville Bluegrass Band for Unleashed

Folk
Best Traditional Folk Album
Ramblin' Jack Elliott for South Coast
Best Contemporary Folk Album
Emmylou Harris for Wrecking Ball

Gospel
Best Pop/Contemporary Gospel Album
Michael W. Smith for I'll Lead You Home
Best Rock Gospel Album
Ashley Cleveland for Lesson of Love
Best Traditional Soul Gospel Album
Shirley Caesar for Shirley Caesar Live – He Will Come
Best Contemporary Soul Gospel Album
CeCe Winans for Alone In His Presence
Best Southern Gospel, Country Gospel or Bluegrass Gospel Album
Bill Hearn (producer) for Amazing Grace – A Country Salute to Gospel performed by various artists
Best Gospel Album by a Choir or Chorus
Carol Cymbala (choir director) for Praise Him – Live! performed by the Brooklyn Tabernacle Choir

Historical
Best Historical Album
John Pfeiffer (producer & notes writer), Ray Hall, Thomas MacCluskey, James P. Nichols,  Anthony Salvatore, Jon M. Samuels, David Satz (engineers), J.J. Stelmach (art director), Gabriel Banat, Grant Beglarian, Robert Cowan, Mortimer W. Frank, Richard Freed, Erick Friedman, Harris Goldsmith, Josefa Heifetz, George Jellinek, Irving Kolodin, Jacob Lateiner, Laurence Lesser, Myra C. Livingston, John Maltese, John Anthony Maltese, Leonard Pennario & Brooks Smith (notes writers) for The Heifetz Collection performed by Jascha Heifetz & various artists

Jazz
Best Jazz Instrumental Solo
Michael Brecker for "Impressions"
Best Jazz Instrumental Performance, Individual or Group
McCoy Tyner Trio & Michael Brecker for "Infinity"
Best Large Jazz Ensemble Performance
Tom Scott for "All Blues" performed by the GRP All-Star Big Band
Best Jazz Vocal Performance
Lena Horne for An Evening with Lena Horne
Best Contemporary Jazz Performance
Pat Metheny Group for "We Live Here"
Best Latin Jazz Performance
Jobim for Antonio Brasileiro

Latin
Best Latin Pop Performance
Jon Secada for Amor
Best Tropical Latin Performance
Gloria Estefan for Abriendo Puertas
Best Mexican-American/Tejano Music Performance
Flaco Jiménez for Flaco Jiménez

Musical show
Best Musical Show Album
Arif Mardin, Jerry Leiber, Mike Stoller (producers) & the original Broadway cast for Smokey Joe's Cafe – The Songs of Leiber & Stoller

Music video
Best Music Video, Short Form
Ceán Chaffin (producer), Mark Romanek (director), Janet Jackson & Michael Jackson for "Scream"
Best Music Video, Long Form
Robert Warr (producer), François Girard (director) & Peter Gabriel for Secret World Live

New Age
Best New Age Album
George Winston for Forest

Packaging and notes
Best Recording Package
Joni Mitchell & Robbie Cavolina (art directors) for Turbulent Indigo performed by Joni Mitchell
Best Recording Package – Boxed
Frank Zappa & Gail Zappa (art directors) for Civilization Phaze III performed by Frank Zappa
Best Album Notes
Rob Bowman (notes writer) for The Complete Stax/Volt Soul Singles, Vol. 3: 1972–1975 performed by various artists

Polka
Best Polka Album
Jimmy Sturr for I Love to Polka

Pop
Best Female Pop Vocal Performance
 "No More 'I Love You's'" – Annie Lennox
 "Fantasy" – Mariah Carey
 "I Know" – Dionne Farris
 "One of Us" – Joan Osborne
 "Colors of the Wind" – Vanessa Williams

Best Male Pop Vocal Performance
 "Kiss From a Rose" – Seal
 "Have You Ever Really Loved a Woman?" – Bryan Adams
 "You Are Not Alone" – Michael Jackson
 "Believe" – Elton John
 "When We Dance" – Sting

Best Pop Performance by a Duo or Group with Vocals
 "Let Her Cry – "Hootie & the Blowfish
 "I Can Love You Like That" – All-4-One
 "Love Will Keep Us Alive" – Eagles
 "I'll Be There for You" – The Rembrandts
 "Waterfalls" – TLC

Best Pop Collaboration with Vocals
 "Have I Told You Lately" – The Chieftains & Van Morrison
 "Someone to Love" – Jon B. featuring Babyface
 "When You Love Someone" – Anita Baker with James Ingram
 "One Sweet Day" – Mariah Carey and Boyz II Men
 "Scream" – Michael Jackson and Janet Jackson

Best Pop Instrumental Performance
 "Mariachi Suite" – Los Lobos
 "In Memory of Elizabeth Reed" – The Allman Brothers Band
 "Have Yourself a Merry Little Christmas" – Kenny G
 "Yesterday" – Dave Grusin
 "Song B" – Bruce Hornsby

Best Pop Album
 Turbulent Indigo – Joni Mitchell
 Larry Klein, producer
 Daydream – Mariah Carey
 Walter Afanasieff, Mariah Carey, Jermaine Dupri, Dave Hall, David Morales & Manuel Seal, producers
 Hell Freezes Over – Eagles
 Eagles, Elliot Scheiner, Rob Jacobs, and Stan Lynch, producers
 Medusa – Annie Lennox
 Stephen Lipson, producer
 Bedtime Stories – Madonna
 Madonna, Dallas Austin, Babyface, Dave Hall, and Nellee Hooper, producers

Production and engineering
Best Engineered Album, Non-Classical
David Bianco, Jim Scott, Richard Dodd & Stephen McLaughlin (engineers) for Wildflowers performed by Tom Petty

Best Engineered Album, Classical
Jonathan Stokes, Michael Mailes (engineers), Herbert Blomstedt (conductor) & the San Francisco Symphony for Bartók: Concerto for Orchestra; Kossuth – Symphonic Poem

Producer of the Year
Babyface

Classical Producer of the Year
Steven Epstein

R&B
Best Female R&B Vocal Performance
Anita Baker for "I Apologize"
Best Male R&B Vocal Performance
Stevie Wonder for "For Your Love"
Best R&B Performance by a Duo or Group with Vocal
TLC for "Creep"
Best R&B Song
Stevie Wonder (songwriter) for "For Your Love"
Best R&B Album
TLC for CrazySexyCool

Rap
Best Rap Solo Performance
 "Gangsta's Paradise" – Coolio
 "Keep Their Heads Ringin'" – Dr. Dre
 "Big Poppa" – The Notorious B.I.G.
 "I Wish" – Skee-Lo
 "Dear Mama" – 2Pac

Best Rap Performance by a Duo or Group
"I'll Be There for You/You're All I Need to Get By" – Method Man featuring Mary J. Blige
"1st of tha Month" – Bone Thugs-n-Harmony
"Throw Your Set in the Air" – Cypress Hill
"Feel Me Flow" – Naughty by Nature
"What Would You Do?" – Tha Dogg Pound

Best Rap Album
Poverty's Paradise – Naughty by Nature
E. 1999 Eternal – Bone Thugs-n-Harmony; D.J. U-Neek, producer
Return to the 36 Chambers: The Dirty Version – Ol' Dirty Bastard; the RZA, producer
I Wish – Skee-Lo; Walter "Kandor" Kahn & Skee-Lo, producers
Me Against the World – 2Pac

Reggae
Best Reggae Album
Shaggy for Boombastic

Rock
Best Female Rock Vocal Performance 
Alanis Morissette for "You Oughta Know"
Best Male Rock Vocal Performance
Tom Petty for "You Don't Know How It Feels"
Best Rock Performance by a Duo or Group with Vocal
Blues Traveler for "Run-Around"
Best Rock Instrumental Performance
Allman Brothers Band for "Jessica"
Best Hard Rock Performance
Pearl Jam for "Spin the Black Circle"
Best Metal Performance
Nine Inch Nails for "Happiness in Slavery"
Best Rock Song
Alanis Morissette & Glen Ballard (songwriters) for "You Oughta Know" performed by Alanis Morissette
Best Rock Album
Glen Ballard (producer) & Alanis Morissette for Jagged Little Pill

Spoken
Best Spoken Word or Non-musical Album
Maya Angelou for Phenomenal Woman
Best Spoken Comedy Album
Jonathan Winters for Crank(y) Calls

Traditional pop
Best Traditional Pop Vocal Performance
Frank Sinatra for Duets II

World
Best World Music Album
Deep Forest for Boheme

Special merit awards

MusiCares Person of the Year
Quincy Jones

References

 038
1996 in California
1996 music awards
1996 in Los Angeles
1996 in American music
Grammy
February 1996 events in the United States